Sékou Traoré is a filmmaker from Burkina Faso.  He and his friends Dani Kouyaté and Issa Traoré de Brahima established the production company Sahelis Productions in 1992.
He has worked as director, producer and production manager on a number of films, including both fiction and documentary.

Filmography
A partial list of films:

References

Living people
Burkinabé film directors
Year of birth missing (living people)
21st-century Burkinabé people